Clethrophora distincta is a moth of the family Nolidae first described by John Henry Leech in 1889. It is found in Taiwan, Korea and Japan.

The wingspan is 41–45 mm. The ground colour of the forewings is deeply green, while it is red for the hindwings.

The larvae feed on Quercus species.

References

Moths described in 1889
Chloephorinae
Moths of Japan
Moths of Korea
Moths of Taiwan